The NBA Clutch Player of the Year Award is an honor given to a National Basketball Association (NBA) player who "best comes through for his teammates in the clutch". The award is named after Jerry West, who had a reputation of being a clutch player when he played for the Los Angeles Lakers.  The award debuted for the 2022–23 season, and players are voted on by a media panel based on nominations from NBA head coaches.

References 

Most Valuable
National Basketball Association lists

National Basketball Association
2022 establishments in the United States
Awards established in 2022